Western Québec School Board (WQSB) is an English-language school district based in Gatineau, Quebec, Canada. It was formerly a Protestant school district. The chairperson is James Shea, and the director general is Mike Dubeau.

History
The WQSB was created by a series of amalgamations of smaller school boards. In 1998, when Québec's religious school boards were replaced by linguistic boards, seven English-language schools formerly designated as Roman Catholic were transferred to the WQSB.  School boards in Québec had been organized along confessional lines, Catholic and Protestant, since before Canadian Confederation.

Schools
The board operates the following schools:
Buckingham Elementary School (Gatineau, QC; Secteur Buckingham)
Chelsea Elementary School  (Chelsea, QC)
D'Arcy McGee High School (Gatineau, QC; Secteur Aylmer)
Dr. S.E. McDowell Elementary School (Shawville, QC)
Dr. Wilbert Keon School  
Eardley Elementary School (Gatineau, QC; Secteur Aylmer)
G. Théberge School 
Golden Valley School 
Greater Gatineau Elementary School  (Gatineau, QC; Secteur Gatineau)
Hadley Junior High School  (Gatineau, QC; Secteur Hull)
Lord Aylmer School (Gatineau, QC; Secteur Aylmer)
Maniwaki Woodland School  (Maniwaki, QC)
Namur Intermediate School (Namur, QC)
Noranda School 
Onslow Elementary School 
Philemon Wright High School  (Gatineau, QC; Secteur Hull)
Pierre Elliott Trudeau Elementary School (Gatineau, QC; Secteur Hull)
Poltimore Elementary School (Val-des-Monts, Qc; Secteur Poltimore)
Pontiac High School (Shawville, QC)
Queen Elizabeth Elementary School  
South Hull Elementary School (Gatineau, QC; Secteur Aylmer)
St. John's/John Paul II School 
St. Michael's High School (Low, QC)
Symmes Junior High School (Gatineau, QC; Secteur Aylmer)
Wakefield Elementary School (La Peche, QC; Secteur Wakefield)

References

External links
Official site
Official site 

Education in Gatineau
School districts in Quebec
Quebec English School Boards Association